Canencia is a municipality of the autonomous community of Madrid in central Spain. It is located in the comarca of Sierra Norte.

References

External links

Municipalities in the Community of Madrid